Smeller may refer to:
 Witch smeller, a title amongst the Zulu and other Bantu-speaking peoples of Southern Africa
 Smeller (installation), an installation by the Berlin-based artist Wolfgang Georgsdorf.
 Osmodrama
 Smeller, an informal term for the nose.

See also
 Smell (disambiguation)